The 2018 Southland Conference tournament was held at Joe Miller Field on the campus of McNeese State University in Lake Charles, Louisiana, from May 8 through 11, 2018. The tournament winner earned the Southland Conference's automatic bid to the 2018 NCAA Division I softball tournament. The Championship game was broadcast on ESPNU. The remainder of the tournament aired on the Southland Digital Network.

Format
With Abilene Christian and Incarnate Word both being eligible for the tournament, the Southland Conference expanded from 6 teams to the top 8 teams. The first two games were single elimination while the rest of the tournament was a double elimination format.

Tournament

New Orleans does not sponsor a softball team.

Line Scores 
All times listed are Central Daylight Time.

Day One

No. 5 Central Arkansas vs. No. 8 Sam Houston State

No. 6 Abilene Christian vs. No. 7 Northwestern State

No. 4 Southeastern Louisiana vs. No. 8 Sam Houston State

No. 3 McNeese vs. No. 7 Northwestern State

Day Two

No. 1 Nicholls vs. No. 4 Southeastern Louisiana

No. 2 Stephen F. Austin vs. No. 3 McNeese

No. 7 Northwestern State vs. No. 4 Southeastern Louisiana

No. 8 Sam Houston State vs. No. 2 Stephen F. Austin

Day Three

No. 1 Nicholls vs. No. 3 McNeese

No. 4 Southeastern Louisiana vs. No. 8 Sam Houston State

No. 1 Nicholls vs. No. 4 Southeastern Louisiana

Day Four

Championship Game: No. 3 McNeese vs. No. 1 Nicholls

Awards and honors
Source:

Tournament MVP: Morgan Catron, McNeese

All-Tournament Teams:
Morgan Catron, McNeese
Moriah Strother, Nicholls
Kasey Frederick, Nicholls
Mahalia Gibson. Southeastern Louisiana
Codi Carpenter, Sam Houston State
Erika Piancastelli, McNeese
Alexandria Saldivar, McNeese
Maddie Edmonston, Southeastern Louisiana
Amanda Gianelloni, Nicholls
Megan Landry, Nicholls
Lindsey McLeod, Sam Houston State
Alexandria Flores, McNeese

See also
2018 Southland Conference baseball tournament

References

Southland Conference softball tournament
Tournament
2018 Southland Conference softball season